João Zero (born August 7, 1950, in São Paulo) is a Brazilian cartoonist and illustrator journalist. He was the son of an old family newsstand owner from Italy.

Zero Was born in São Paulo, in the area called "Bixiga" Bela Vista, on August 7, 1950. His paternal grandfather was Italian Polignano a Mare and his maternal grandfather was Japanese from Hiroshima. He started drawing in a serious way in a newspaper called "Movimento" in the 1970s, together with the twin brothers Chico and Paulo Caruso, Angeli, Bruno Liberati, Jayme Leao, Alcy, Laerte, Jota, Maringoni, Geandre and Luis Ge. These people used to sit by a big wooden table in one of the writing offices of the newspaper to wait for the texts to be illustrated.

Censorship was widespread in Brazil when Zero started. In order to publish a newspaper's complete edition, it was necessary to have two editions because the censorship, used to cut a lot of articles and pictures, which was almost equivalent to half of the edition. This forced the editor to use the material remains for the final edition. The censorship cut the equivalent to a one newspaper and with the rest was made the other.

External links
 Official website

Living people
1950 births
Brazilian artists
Brazilian cartoonists
People from São Paulo